Peter J. Cammarano III (born July 22, 1977) is an American disbarred attorney, former Democratic politician and a convicted felon. He was the 37th mayor of Hoboken, New Jersey, serving from July 1 until July 31, 2009. Cammarano was arrested by the FBI on corruption charges on July 23, 2009 as part of an international criminal investigation known as Operation Bid Rig; he resigned from office eight days later. He pleaded guilty to extortion in April 2010 and was later sentenced to 24 months in federal prison.

Biography
Cammarano was born on July 22, 1977 in Wayne, New Jersey. He graduated from Boston University and Seton Hall University School of Law. In 2001, Cammarano moved to Hoboken, New Jersey. He served as the Hoboken coordinator of the 2004 John Kerry presidential campaign and as the New Jersey legal director for U.S. Senator Robert Menendez's 2006 campaign.

A Democrat, Cammarano was elected Councilman-at-Large in Hoboken in a 2005 run-off election.  At the time, he was an associate attorney at Genova, Burns & Vernoia, an election law firm.

On June 9, 2009, Cammarano won the Hoboken Mayor's race in a runoff election, defeating Dawn Zimmer by 161 votes. Observers credited his victory to absentee and provisional ballots, along with the hiring of many residents from districts that eventually voted in large numbers for him. Zimmer's three running mates won control of the City Council despite Cammarano's mayoral victory. Cammarano was sworn into office on July 1, 2009. At age 32, he became the youngest mayor in city history. 

On July 23, 2009, just 22 days after assuming office, Cammarano was arrested by the FBI as part of a major political corruption and international money laundering conspiracy probe known as Operation Bid Rig. Cammarano was charged by the U.S. Attorney's Office for the District of New Jersey with accepting $25,000 in cash bribes from an undercover cooperating witness. Cammarano announced his resignation on July 31, 2009. In his resignation letter, Cammarano said, "I apologize to the residents of Hoboken for the disruption and disappointment this case has caused". He was succeeded by Zimmer, who had been elected City Council president and as such was next in line as acting mayor until elections could be held.

Cammarano pleaded guilty on April 20, 2010 to extorting cash contributions in return for official influence and admitted accepting $25,000 in illicit cash contributions in exchange for exercising his future official influence and authority.  Cammarano remained free on a $100,000 bond pending his sentence.  The guilty plea effectively ended his political career; New Jersey, like most states, does not allow convicted felons to hold office.

On August 5, 2010, Cammarano was sentenced to 24 months in federal prison. In late September, 2010, Cammarano was designated by the Federal Bureau of Prisons to serve his 24-month sentence at the minimum security component at Lewisburg Federal Penitentiary in Pennsylvania and was scheduled to report there on October 4, 2010. He was released from Lewisburg Federal Prison Camp in Pennsylvania on Wednesday September 14, 2011 and sent to a halfway house in New York.

After his conviction, the New Jersey Supreme Court disciplinary review board suspended Cammarano's law license for three years. This decision was appealed to the Supreme Court, which disbarred him in September 2014.

References

External links
Hoboken Mayor Cammarano arrested by FBI: report
Details of FBI allegations against Cammarano and former Councilman Michael Schaffer
N.J. officials, N.Y. rabbis caught in federal money laundering, corruption sweep
Cammarano & Schaffer criminal complaint, United States Department of Justice, July 23, 2009

1977 births
Mayors of Hoboken, New Jersey
People from Wayne, New Jersey
Boston University alumni
New Jersey Democrats
Seton Hall University School of Law alumni
Living people
Operation Bid Rig
Politicians convicted of extortion under color of official right
Supreme Court of New Jersey
New Jersey politicians convicted of corruption
New Jersey politicians convicted of crimes